Baku Olympic Stadium, is a stadium, designed and constructed to meet the international standards for stadiums set by the Union of European Football Associations (UEFA), the International Federation of Association Football (FIFA) and the International Association of Athletics Federations (IAAF). It is the largest stadium in Azerbaijan.

Construction of the 225,000-square-meter stadium on a 650,000-square-meter site was completed in February 2015. The six-storey, 65.7 meter structure near Boyukshor Lake, Baku, Azerbaijan, opened on 6 March 2015. The main tenant of the stadium is Azerbaijan's national football team, who moved from their previous home at the Tofiq Bahramov Republican Stadium. In June 2015 the stadium served as the main venue for the European Games, hosting the opening and closing ceremonies, and the athletic games. The venue hosted three group games and a quarterfinal at the UEFA Euro 2020. A green area is being developed around the stadium, which is accessible via public transport.

History

The foundation ceremony  

The foundation of the Baku Olympic Stadium was laid on 6 June 2011 in a ceremony to mark the 100th anniversary of Azerbaijani football.

The ceremony was attended by the President of Azerbaijan Ilham Aliyev and his spouse Mehriban Aliyeva, FIFA president Sepp Blatter, UEFA president Michel Platini, prominent members of the global football community, heads of various federations, football veterans and other guests. Azerbaijani President Ilham Aliyev was informed about the future plans for the construction of the stadium. Speaking at the ceremony, Blatter said:

"This is really beautiful, grand building, and more than 60 thousand football fans coming to the stadium will be able to enjoy football."

Aliyev then placed a symbolic metal capsule inside a football. His son Heydar, scoring a goal in a symbolic gate, dropped the ball into the foundation. Presidents Aliyev with Blatter and Platini, operated a switch starting the concrete pour, and signed a football, which was preserved in memory of the ceremony.

Construction 
Despite the groundbreaking ceremony taking place in 2011, the construction of the stadium started only in November 2012 with the excavation and backfilling of the stadium area.

The stadium was completed on February 28, 2015, and the opening took place on 6 March 2015. President Aliyev participated in the opening ceremony.

The total layout of the stadium is 617,000m² and has a capacity for 68,000 people. It is six stories tall.

Baku was ready to host the first European Games in 2015. The Olympic Stadium Project was seen as the most important and prestigious project undertaken by Azerbaijan for the games. Main stadium layout area is 87,000m², total confined space 215,000 m², Maximum Height from ground 60m².
The project was funded by the SOCAR. A Turkish company Tekfen Construction and Installation Co.,Inc, were given a design & build contract.

Along with the stadium, there were built a number of hotels, a parking venue (3,617 car places), and green space (81,574 square meters).

Stadium contains VVIP, VIP - CIP Suites total 127 each with 720 spectators capacity, total interior special area of 25,200m² and total car parking capacity for 3,078 cars. 1,800 seating capacity warm up area, MEP Building, information centre and two external buildings are other building of the Project.

Events
The stadium hosted athletics and ceremonies during 2015 European Games.

The Stadium hosted all of Qarabag's Champions League group stage matches in the 2017–18 UEFA Champions League.

The stadium hosted the 2019 UEFA Europa League Final on 29 May 2019.

UEFA Euro 2020 
The stadium hosted three group stage matches and one quarter-finals match at the UEFA Euro 2020, which was postponed to 2021 due to the COVID-19 pandemic in Europe.

Notable matches

See also
 List of football stadiums in Azerbaijan
 List of European stadiums by capacity

References

External links

Football venues in Baku
Athletics (track and field) venues in Azerbaijan
Multi-purpose stadiums in Azerbaijan
UEFA Euro 2020 stadiums
2015 European Games venues
Sports venues completed in 2015
2015 establishments in Azerbaijan